Wulingyuan is a scenic and historical site in the Wulingyuan District of South Central China's Hunan Province. It was inscribed as a UNESCO World Heritage Site in 1992. It features 40 caves, many with large calcite deposits and a natural bridge named Tianqiashengkong (meaning 'bridge across the sky'), which is one of the highest natural bridges in the world. The site also provides habitat for many vulnerable species, including the dhole, Asiatic black bear and Chinese water deer. 

The park covers an area of 690 square kilometers (266 square miles). Wulingyuan forms part of the Wuling Mountain Range. The scenic area consists of four national parks, which are the Zhangjiajie National Forest Park, Suoxi Valley Nature Reserve, Tianzi Mountain Nature Reserve and the recently added Yangjiajie Scenic Area. Overall there are over 560 attraction sights to view.

Geology 
The quartzite sandstone pillars and the surrounding regions were formed during the Devonian period (400 to 350 million years ago) from a combination of tectonic uplift and water erosion. 
The highest area in the park is Huang Shi Zhai.

Gallery

References

External links 
China’s Ancient Skyline

National parks of China
Parks in Hunan
Quartzite formations
Tourist attractions in Zhangjiajie
World Heritage Sites in China
AAAAA-rated tourist attractions